Stark County Educational Service Center is a school district located in Stark County, Ohio, United States.

External links
 Official Site

School districts in Stark County, Ohio